There are no diplomatic relations between Armenia and Azerbaijan, largely due to the ongoing Nagorno-Karabakh conflict. The two neighboring states had formal governmental relations between 1918 and 1921, during their brief independence from the collapsed Russian Empire, as the First Republic of Armenia and the Democratic Republic of Azerbaijan; these relations existed from the period after the Russian Revolution until they were occupied and annexed by the Soviet Union, becoming the constituent republics of Soviet Armenia and Soviet Azerbaijan. Due to the two wars waged by the countries in the past century—one from 1918 to 1921 and another from 1988 to 1994—the two have had strained relations. In the wake of ongoing hostilities, social memory of Soviet-era cohabitation is widely repressed (censored and stigmatized).

History

Relations between 1918 and 1921
Upon the disintegration of the Transcaucasian Federation with the proclamation of the independent Democratic Republic of Georgia on May 26, 1918, both Azerbaijan and Armenia proclaimed their independence on the same day, May 28, 1918. Both Armenia and Azerbaijan laid claim to the territory which they saw as historically and ethnically theirs; these territorial disputes led to the Armenian–Azerbaijani War between 1918 and 1920, a series of conflicts that ended only when both Armenia and Azerbaijan were annexed by the Soviet Union.

Soviet Union (1922–1991)
Upon the establishment of the USSR in 1922, Azerbaijan SSR and Armenian SSR became constituent states, initially as a part of the Transcaucasian SFSR, and from 1936 as separate entities within the union. The relations between the Azerbaijani and Armenian authorities, including in Nagorno-Karabakh Autonomous Oblast (NKAO), were generally peaceful and friendly whilst all Soviet entities. In December 1947, the communist leaders of Armenia and Azerbaijan addressed a joint letter to supreme Soviet leader Joseph Stalin. In the letter, the leaders of the two republics agreed to relocate 130,000 Azerbaijanis from Armenia to Azerbaijan, thereby creating vacancies for Armenians coming to Armenia from abroad. Though occasional confrontations did occur, particularly the 1948 and the 1964 public protests in Armenia which resulted in the exodus of a large number of Azeris, they remained unknown to a broader public due to strict Soviet censorship. According to Soviet Census (1979), 160,841 Azeris lived in Armenia and 352,410 Armenians lived in Azerbaijan outside of Nagorno-Karabakh. The Soviet Census (1989) showed a decline of those minorities to 84,860 Azeris in Armenia and 245.045 Armenians in Azerbaijan outside of Nagorno-Karabakh.

First Nagorno-Karabakh War

In 1988, the Armenians of Karabakh voted to secede and join Armenia. This was met by pogroms (attacks) of Armenians chiefly in three cities of Azerbaijan: Sumgait, Baku, Kirovabad. These attacks led to the military conflict that became known as the Nagorno-Karabakh War. The Soviet government in Moscow initially backed Azerbaijan in return for Azerbaijan supporting Mikhail Gorbachev's attempts to keep the Soviet Union together. Soviet and Soviet Azerbaijani troops both forcibly uprooted Armenian civilians in part of Nagorno-Karabakh during Operation Ring. Following the dissolution of the Soviet Union, the war clearly became an international conflict between sovereign states.

The war resulted in de facto Armenian occupation of former NKAO and seven surrounding Azerbaijani territories, this advance was effectively halted when both sides agreed to observe a cease-fire that  has been in effect since May 1994. In late 1995, Armenia and Azerbaijan agreed to find a negotiated resolution to the conflict over Nagorno-Karabakh mediated by the OSCE Minsk Group. The Minsk Group is currently co-chaired by the US, France, and Russia and comprises Armenia, Azerbaijan, Turkey, and several European states.

During the conflict the largest city Stepanakert was besieged by Azerbaijani forces from late 1991 to May 1992 whereby Armenians were bombarded, civilian and armed. The indiscriminate shelling, sniper shooting and aerial attacks killed or maimed hundreds of civilians and destroyed homes, hospitals and other buildings that were not legitimate military targets, and generally terrorized the civilian population. Azerbaijan blockaded all essential supplies, including water, electricity, food and medicines causing many deaths. Human Rights Watch reported that key bases used by forces for bombardment were the towns of Khojaly and Shusha.

Amid this Khojaly massacre - the mass murder of ethnic Azerbaijani citizens of Khojaly occurred on 26 February 1992. According to Human Rights Watch, the tragedy struck when a large column of residents, accompanied by a few dozen retreating fighters, fled the city as it fell to Armenian forces. As they approached the border with Azerbaijan, they came across an Armenian military post and were fired upon".

Relations from 1994-2015

After the war, relations between Armenia and Azerbaijan remained very tense. In 2008, Azerbaijani president Ilham Aliyev declared that "Nagorno Karabakh will never be independent; the position is backed by international mediators as well; Armenia has to accept the reality" and that "in 1918, Yerevan was granted to the Armenians. Khanate of Iravan was the Azeri territory, the Armenians were guests here."

Citizens of Armenia, people of Armenian descent and those who have visited the disputed region are forbidden entry to Azerbaijan without prior formal authorisation.

In 2008, in what became known as the 2008 Mardakert Skirmishes, Armenia and Azerbaijan clashed over Nagorno-Karabakh. The fighting between the two sides was brief, with few casualties on either side.

June 2010 saw a brief flare-up of the conflict, resulting in the deaths of four Armenian soldiers and one Azeri soldier. The clash came a day after peace talks between the presidents of the two countries held in Moscow.

On August 31, 2010, a border clash killed three Armenians and two Azeris. The Armenian army claimed up to seven Azeris had been killed. Both sides blamed the other for the incident.

On June 24, 2011, the two sides met in Kazan, Russia, to negotiate an end to the Nagorno-Karabakh issue, but the talks ended in failure. Following the breakdown of talks, the Azeri President Ilham Aliyev used the June 26 Salvation Day military parade to warn Armenia that Azerbaijan may retake Nagorno-Karabakh by force. On 5 October 2011, border clashes around Nagorno Karabakh left one Armenian soldier and two Azeris dead. Two Armenians were also wounded by sniper fire the same day. Another violent incident occurred on 5 June 2012 when, according to the Azerbaijani side, Armenian troops crossed the border and shot dead five Azerbaijani soldiers before withdrawing. Armenia denied the claim and accused Azerbaijan of crossing the border first.

In October 2013, Zakir Hasanov was appointed as Azerbaijani Defence Minister despite controversy.

From July 27 to August 8, 2014, clashes began once again between Armenian and Azerbaijani forces. Reported casualties of the clashes were some of the highest since the 1994 ceasefire agreement that ended the first Nagorno-Karabakh War.

2016 clashes

After the 2016 clashes, in which an estimated 350 troops and civilians from both sides were killed, Azerbaijan declared a unilateral cease fire (the clashes started when Azerbaijani forces launched strikes to regain control of territory occupied by the Armenia-backed breakaway Nagorno-Karabakh).

2020 clashes and the Second Nagorno-Karabakh War

Both sides clashed weaponry on the Armenia–Azerbaijan border: Tavush and Tovuz (respectively) from 12 until 18 July 2020. Involved were artillery, tanks, and shock drones, and killed were at least 17 soldiers and a civilian. Many more were injured. Both sides reported four commanding or junior officer-rank army deaths, an Azeri being a major general.

On September 27, 2020, heavy fighting along the line of contact between locally based Armenian and Azeri troops resumed. Armenia, Nagorno-Karabakh (or the de facto territory of Artsakh), and Azerbaijan declaring martial law and mobilizing new and existing conscripts and professional soldiers.

On October 9, 2020, the UN High Commissioner for Human Rights, Michelle Bachelet appealed for an urgent ceasefire, citing civilian sufferings in the Nagorno-Karabakh conflict zone. She also raised concerns about overpopulated areas that were becoming targets for the heavy weaponry attacks.

On October 17 a new ceasefire agreement was announced by the Armenian and Azerbaijani foreign ministers following phone calls between Russian Foreign Minister Sergey Lavrov and his counterparts. Lavrov strongly urged the countries to abide by the Moscow deal. However, both sides have accused each other of violating the truce further continuing the conflict. Bachelet expressed concerns on possible war crimes during the clashes between Armenia and Azerbaijan in the Nagorno-Karabakh conflict zone. On October 30, 2020, Armenia and Azerbaijan reached an agreement that abstained them from deliberately targeting the civilians’ population, despite which artillery strikes in populated areas were reported.

Ceasefire

A ceasefire agreement brokered by Russia and agreed upon by Armenia, Azerbaijan, and the Republic of Artsakh (non-signatory) on November 9, 2020, and effective since midnight November 10, 2020, Moscow Time ended all hostilities in the Nagorno-Karabakh region. Azerbaijan claimed victory as it gained control of 5 cities, 4 towns, 240 villages and the entire Azerbaijan–Iran border. Some parts of Nagorno-Karabakh, along with all Armenian-occupied territories surrounding Nagorno-Karabakh are to be ceded to Azerbaijan by December 1, 2020. Azerbaijan was also granted direct land access to its exclave of Nakhchivan via a corridor through Armenia.

Around 2,000 Russian soldiers, led by Rustam Muradov, will be deployed as peacekeeping forces to protect the land corridor between Armenia and the Nagorno-Karabakh region for a mandate of at least five years. Russian forces will also guarantee the roads connecting Azerbaijan and Nakhchivan.

2021-2022 clashes 

On 12 May, clashes continued as Azerbaijani troops crossed into Armenian territory, claiming the area around Lake Sev. Armenian Prime Minister, Nikol Pashinyan, attempted to appeal to the CSTO about it. On 20 May, Azerbaijani servicemen crossed the border near Khoznavar and were forced back to their territory by the Armenian Armed Forces, leaving men wounded on both sides. On 27 May, Azerbaijani forces captured six Armenian soldiers near the border. The EU then urged both sides to pull back their forces and instead engage in negotiations on border demarcation. Armenia and Azerbaijan continued to clash from 7–15 July near Tovuz, Gadabay, and Shusha districts. Azerbaijan then attempted to better their strategic position near Yeraskh, leading to a whole new set of clashes and Yeraskh's shelling, resulting in two wounded and an Armenian soldier dead.

Clashes continued from July 2021 to April 2022, killing and wounding men from both sides of the border.

After failed peace talks, the fighting renewed with the border clashes on September 12. A ceasefire was agreed, to end the fighting after claiming 155 lives from both sides on September 14, two days later.

Prague EPC Summit 

On 6 October 2022, Azeri President Ilham Aliyev and Armenian Prime Minister Nikol Pashinyan met during the European Political Community summit in Prague. In a statement issued following the meeting, the two parties confirmed their commitment to upholding the United Nations Charter and the Alma-Ata Protocol through which they recognize each other’s territorial integrity and sovereignty. The parties also agreed to the deployment of a European Union mission on the Armenian side of their border for a period of two months starting in October 2022.

See also
 
 Foreign relations of Armenia 
 Foreign relations of Azerbaijan
 Armenia–Azerbaijan relations in the Eurovision Song Contest
 Armenia–Azerbaijan border
 Anti-Armenian sentiment in Azerbaijan
 Anti-Azerbaijani sentiment in Armenia
 Armenians in Azerbaijan
 Azerbaijanis in Armenia
 List of conflicts between Azerbaijan and Armenia

References

Further reading
 Sauerborn, Djan; Scianna, Bastian Matteo; Mazziotti, Marius: "Multipolarity is key: Assessing Azerbaijan's foreign policy"

External links
The deadly clashes between Armenia and Azerbaijan in Nagorno-Karabakh, explained, by Joe Hernandez and Charles Maynes, NPR (2022-09-19)

 
Azerbaijan
Bilateral relations of Azerbaijan